Kompas (Compass) is a flagship television news program that broadcasts on the Indonesian TV station  Kompas TV. Its slogan is "Tegas, Terarah, & Menumbuhkan Harapan" (Decisive, Purposeful, & Raising Expectations).

Kompas was launched on  September 9, 2011 by Jakob Oetama. To greet all viewers, every newscast always begins with "Saudara" (brother/sister), not "Pemirsa" (viewer) till present (like Liputan 6). Kompas is anchored by various news personalities, with other crews including Taufik Mihardja and Rosianna Silalahi.

See also 

 Liputan 6
 Fokus

References

External links 

  Official Site
  Official Site
  Kompas TV site

Indonesian television news shows
2011 Indonesian television series debuts
2010s Indonesian television series
Kompas TV
Kompas TV original programming